Hong Choon (1907–1990) was the second president of the Singapore Buddhist Federation and the second abbot of Kong Meng San Phor Kark See Monastery.

Early life
Hong Choon was born in 1907 in Jinjiang, Fujian province, China. In 1922, he was ordained by Hui Quan at Cheng Tian Temple and was given his Dharma name, Hong Choon. During the Sino-Japanese war, Venerable Hong Choon fled southern China with his master, seeking refuge in Singapore.

Hong Choon also studied Feng Shui under Master Yen Ben in the 1950s.

Career
Venerable Hong Choon became the abbot of Kong Meng San Phor Kark See Monastery in 1943, administering the temple and representing it at social and Buddhist functions over more than four decades, propagating Buddhism in Singapore. During his leadership, the monastery transformed from two shrine halls into a monastic facility with a total area as large as ten football fields, the largest venue of Buddhist practice in Singapore. He also initiated the monthly Great Compassion Prayer and propagated the Dharma during his charge.

Ven Hong Choon was the President of Singapore Buddhist Federation, and also nominated as the honorary president of several Buddhist temples in Singapore, and in the Southeast Asia region. The Thai King, Bhumibol Adulyadej conferred him the title of Highest Monk, Phra Ajancin Bodhi Sangvara Sinhanakorn Kanachan in 1987.

Ven Hong Choon was also honored as one of the prominent Feng Shui masters of his time.

Singapore-China Relations
Towards his later years, Ven Hong Choon made eight visits to China between 1982 and 1990. During these pilgrimages, which included visiting sacred Buddhist sites and officiating religious ceremonies, he met Chinese and Buddhist leaders to help restore the monasteries associated with his master Venerable Hui Quan.

Demise
Ven Hong Choon died on 25 December 1990, after which a relic stupa and a memorial hall was built at the Phor Kark See Monastery commemorating him.

See also
Venerable Zhuan Dao
Lee Choon Seng
Buddhism in Singapore
List of Buddhist temples in Singapore

Notes

References
 Chia, Jack Meng-Tat. "Buddhism in Singapore–China Relations: Venerable Hong Choon and His Visits, 1982–1990." The China Quarterly 196 (December 2008): 864–883.
 Ho, Yi Kai. "Seck Hong Choon." In Southeast Asian Personalities of Chinese Descent: A Biographical Dictionary, Volume I, edited by Leo Suryadinata, 947–949. Singapore: Institute of Southeast Asian Studies, 2012. 
Kong Meng San Phor Kark See Monastery website

Hokkien people
Singaporean people of Hokkien descent
Singaporean religious leaders
Singaporean Buddhist monks
1907 births
1990 deaths
20th-century Buddhist monks